Oleksiy Ruslanovych Krasovsky (born 30 March 1994 in Rokytne, Rivne Oblast, Ukraine) is a cross-country skier from Ukraine. He represented Ukraine at the 2014 and 2018 Winter Olympics.

Career
Krasovsky took up skiing in Shostka, where his parents worked in a youth sport school after moving there when he was very young. His parents were his first trainers. Viktor Shamrai and Valerii Liesnikov also trained him.

Krasovsky started his career at major competitions in February 2012 when he competed at the 2012 Winter Youth Olympics in Innsbruck. He was 14th in mixed relay, 20th in 10km classical race, and 25th in sprint competition.

At World Cup, Krasovsky debuted on 29 November 2014 in Ruka, Finland, where he was 80th in sprint competition. As of January 2022, his best World Cup achievement was 58th rank in sprint freestyle in Dresden on 19 December 2020. His best team performance (together with Dmytro Drahun) was 22nd in team sprint on 20 December 2020 in Dresden.

Olympic debut occurred at the 2014 Winter Games in Russian Sochi. There he was 69th in 15km classical race and 81st in sprint competitions.

At his second Winter Olympics in 2018, Krasovsky participated in almost all competitions except the men's relay. He improved his performance a little compared to the previous Games, achieving 50th rank in the 50 km classical style mass start.

In 2022, Krasovsky was nominated for his third Winter Games in Beijing.

Krasovsky participated at four World Championships: in 2013, 2015, 2017, and 2019. His best personal performance was 49th in skiathlon in 2015. He also took part in three Universiades (2013, 2015, 2017), with his best personal result being 6th in 30 km classical mass start in 2017.

Cross-country skiing results
All results are sourced from the International Ski Federation (FIS).

Olympic Games

Distance reduced to 30 km due to weather conditions.

World Championships

World Cup

Season standings

Personal life
He now lives and trains in Shostka, Sumy Oblast. He studied energy management at the Sumy State University.

References

External links

1994 births
Living people
Ukrainian male cross-country skiers
Cross-country skiers at the 2014 Winter Olympics
Cross-country skiers at the 2018 Winter Olympics
Cross-country skiers at the 2022 Winter Olympics
Olympic cross-country skiers of Ukraine
Cross-country skiers at the 2012 Winter Youth Olympics
Competitors at the 2013 Winter Universiade
Competitors at the 2015 Winter Universiade
Competitors at the 2017 Winter Universiade
Sumy State University alumni
Sportspeople from Sumy Oblast